Regional geology is the geological study of large-scale regions. Usually, it encompasses multiple geological disciplines to piece together the history of an area. It is the geologic equivalent of regional geography. The size and the borders of each region are defined by geologically significant boundaries and by the occurrence of geologic processes.  Examples of geologically significant boundaries are the interfingering facies change in sedimentary deposits when discussing a sedimentary basin system, or the leading or boundary thrust of an orogen.

Africa
 Geology of Africa
 Geology of Chad
 Geology of Egypt
 Geology of Madagascar
 Geology of Rwanda
 Geology of Togo

Antarctica
 Geology of Antarctica

Asia
 Geology of Asia
 Geology of Armenia
 Geology of Azerbaijan
 Geology of Bangladesh
 Geology of China
Geology of Fujian
 Geology of Georgia (country)
 Geology of Hong Kong
 Geology of India
 Geology of Sikkim
 Geology of Indonesia
 Geology of Japan
 Geology of New Zealand
 Geology of Pakistan
 Geology of the Philippines
 Geology of Russia
 Geology of Singapore
 Geology of Taiwan
 Geology of Turkey
 Geology of Vietnam

Australia
 Geology of Australia
 Geology of the Australian Capital Territory
 Geology of New South Wales
 Geology of Queensland
 Geology of Tasmania
 Geology of Victoria
 Geology of the Yilgarn Craton

Europe
 Geology of Europe
 Geology of Andorra
 Geology of Armenia
 Geology of Azerbaijan
 Geology of Cyprus
 Geology of Denmark
 Geology of Faroe Islands
 Geology of Greenland
 Geology of Finland
 Geology of France
 Alps
 Aquitaine Basin
 Armorican Massif
 Massif Central
 Paris Basin
 Pyrenees
 Upper Rhine Plain
 Rhone Furrow
 Vosges Mountains
 Geology of Germany
 Geology of Great Britain
 Geology of England
 Geology of the English counties
 Geology of Cambridgeshire
 Geology of Cheshire
 Geology of Cornwall
 Lizard Complex
 Geology of Dorset
 Geology of East Sussex
 Geology of Essex
 Geology of Gloucestershire
 Geology of Hampshire
 Geology of Hertfordshire
 Geology of Lincolnshire
 Geology of Norfolk
 Geology of Rutland
 Geology of Shropshire
 Geology of Somerset
 Geology of Suffolk
 Geology of Yorkshire
 Geology of Scotland
 Geology of Orkney
 Geology of Skye
 Geology of Wales
 Geology of Guernsey
 Geology of Alderney
 Geology of the Iberian Peninsula
 Geology of Iceland
 Geology of Ireland
 Geology of Italy
 Geology of Jersey
 Geology of the Netherlands
 Geology of Norway
 Geology of Svalbard
 Geology of Russia
 Geology of Serbia
 Geology of Slovenia
 Geology of Sweden
 Geology of Gotland
 Geology of Turkey

North America
 Geology of North America
 Geology of the Appalachians
 Geology of New England
 Geology of the Pacific Northwest
 Geology of the Rocky Mountains
 Geology of Canada
 Geology of the United States
 Geology of Alabama
 Geology of Alaska
 Geology of Arizona
 Geology of the Grand Canyon area
 Geology of Arkansas
 Geology of California
 Geology of the Death Valley area
 Geology of the Lassen volcanic area
 Geology of Mount Shasta
 Geology of the Yosemite area
 Geology of Colorado
 Geology of Connecticut
 Geology of Delaware
 Geology of Florida
 Geology of Georgia
 Geology of Hawaii
 Geology of Idaho
 Geology of Illinois
 Geology of Indiana
 Geology of Iowa
 Geology of Kansas
 Geology of Kentucky
 Geology of Louisiana
 Geology of Maine
 Geology of Maryland
 Geology of Massachusetts
 Geology of Michigan
 Geology of Minnesota
 Geology of Mississippi
 Geology of Missouri
 Geology of Montana
 Geology of Nebraska
 Geology of Nevada
 Geology of New Hampshire
 Geology of New Jersey
 Geology of New Mexico
 Geology of New York
 Glacial geology of the Genesee River
 Geology of North Carolina
 Geology of North Dakota
 Geology of Ohio
 Geology of Oklahoma
 Geology of Oregon
 Geology of Pennsylvania
 Geology of Rhode Island
 Geology of South Carolina
 Geology of South Dakota
 Geology of Tennessee
 Geology of Texas
 Geology of Utah
 Geology of the Bryce Canyon area
 Geology of the Canyonlands area 
 Geology of the Capitol Reef area
 Geology of the Zion and Kolob canyons area
 Geology of Vermont
 Geology of Virginia
 Geology of Washington
 Geology of Washington, D.C.
 Geology of Mount Adams 
 Geology of West Virginia
 Geology of Wisconsin
 Geology of Wyoming
 Geology of the Grand Teton area

South America
 Geology of South America
 Geology of Bolivia
 Geology of Chile
 Geology of Colombia
 Geology of the Falkland Islands
 Geology of Uruguay

By mountain range
 Geology of the Alps
 Geology of the Andes
 Geology of the Appalachians
 Geology of the Himalaya
 Geology of the Rocky Mountains

References

 

Compagnoni, R. (2003). "HP metamorphic belt of the western Alps". Episodes. 26 (3): 200–204. Geology of Mid-way Range